Cardinal Lemoine is a station on Line 10 of the Paris Métro. It is located the 5th arrondissement.

History

The station was opened on 26 April 1931 with the transfer of the section of Line 10 between Maubert – Mutualité and Place Monge to Line 7. Line 10 was deviated from its old route east of Maubert – Mutualité to the new station of Jussieu. Cardinal Lemoine was built at the southeastern end of the old route under Rue Monge.

It is named after the Rue du Cardinal Lemoine, named after Cardinal Jean Lemoine (1250–1313), a papal legate of Pope Boniface VIII to Philip IV the Fair. The Lycée Henri-IV is nearby.

Station layout

References
Roland, Gérard (2003). Stations de métro. D’Abbesses à Wagram. Éditions Bonneton.

Paris Métro stations in the 5th arrondissement of Paris
Railway stations in France opened in 1931